The Hafei Baili (百利) is a city car produced by Chinese automaker Hafei from 1997 to 2004.

Overview

The Hafei Baili was inspired largely from the Daewoo Tico. The car was equipped with an inline-three water-cooled 0.870 liter engine, producing 30kW and 64Nm of torque.

The Baili model was also made by a subsidiary of Hafei Motor, Anhui Anchi. The model produced by Anhui Anchi was essentially a rebadge and was called the Anchi Baili. The price of the Hafei Baili in 2004 starts from 30,800 yuan.

References

City cars
Cars introduced in 1997
Hatchbacks
Front-wheel-drive vehicles
Cars of China